is a 1962 Japanese epic science fiction disaster film directed by Ishirō Honda, with special effects by Eiji Tsuburaya. Based on an idea by Jojiro Okami, the film is about mankind's efforts to move Earth out of its orbit to prevent it from colliding with a runaway white dwarf star. The film was extensively edited for its American release.

Plot
On September 29, 1979, the Interstellar Exploration Agency launches a Japanese rocket ship, the JX-1 Hawk, into space on a nine-month journey to investigate Saturn. At its conclusion, however, the crew is given a new mission after scientists discover a runaway star, which the International Astronomical Union nicknamed "Gorath", is somehow running amok. Upon encountering and while investigating Gorath's rapid movement through the Solar System, the JX-1 Hawk crew discover it is smaller than Earth, yet has 6,000 times its gravity. They manage to transmit their data back to Earth before an enormous gravity well destroys the ship, killing the crew.

A month later in 1980, astronomers and astrophysicists throughout the international community announce that Gorath will collide with the Earth in two years' time. At the United Nations, a gathering of Earth's top scientists attempts to resolve the situation by pooling together large amounts of technical advancements they made in the past two decades. After a debriefing, the scientific community reveals the South Pole Operation, which involves a base in Antarctica designed to house a large international team of engineers and scientists and the construction of huge "mega-thrusters" which will propel the Earth out of Gorath's path within 100 days and move Earth back once the danger has passed. The U.N. approves and sends the prototype sub-light spacecraft JX-2 Eagle into space to obtain further data on Gorath.

Construction on the South Pole Operation base goes underway as ships and helicopters from several nations bring in building materials and powerful, mobile heat-generating devices known as atomic burrowers are quickly cobbled together to assist in creating the caverns required to house the mega-thrusters. Meanwhile, the JX-2 Eagle crew succeeds in its mission, learning that Gorath is absorbing space debris within its gravity well to continuously add to its mass, and transmit the data to U.N. space stations. On Earth, the mega-thrusters are activated for a test run while citizens from around the world watch on a live broadcast. As the Earth gently moves, the South Pole Operation is hailed as a success. The JX-2 Eagle and space stations learn of this development and are ordered to return to deny Gorath more mass.

However, the heat generated by the mega-thrusters causes a giant, walrus-like monster later dubbed "Maguma" to emerge from the tundra and attack the South Pole Operation base in response to their intrusion. In response, a small VTOL aircraft is equipped with a powerful laser to stop Maguma. Determined to do so without killing the monster, the pilot uses the laser to create an avalanche and bury it. However, Maguma easily escapes and resumes its attack, leaving the crew with little choice but to kill it. As Gorath absorbs Saturn's rings, the JX-2 Eagle crew successfully returns to Earth.

As the enormous celestial body becomes visible to the naked eye, Earth's tides begin to rise and a state of emergency is declared. Gorath absorbs and obliterates the Moon. It also floods Tokyo and the mega-thrusters and causes an earthquake that destroys the JX-2 Eagle and the Interstellar Exploration Agency's Mount Fuji facility. Even in spite of these disasters, Earth is successfully moved out of Gorath's path.   (The problem of moving it back is mentioned, with no solution proposed.)

Cast
 Ryō Ikebe as Dr. Tazawa - Astrophysicist 
 Yumi Shirakawa as Tomoko Sonoda
 Akira Kubo as Tatsuma Kanai - Cadet Astronaut
 Kumi Mizuno as Takiko Nomura
 Hiroshi Tachikawa as Wakabayashi - Pilot of Ōtori
 Akihiko Hirata as Endō - Captain of Ōtori
 Kenji Sahara as Saiki - Vice Captain of Ōtori
 Jun Tazaki as Raizō Sonoda - Tomoko's Father
 Ken Uehara as Dr. Kōno - Astrophysicist
 Takashi Shimura as Kensuke Sonoda - Paleontologist
 Seizaburō Kawazu as Tada - Minister of Finance
 Kō Mishima as Sanada - Engineer
 Sachio Sakai as Physician
 Takamaru Sasaki as Prime Minister Seki
 Kō Nishimura as Murata - Secretary of Space
 Fumio Sakashita as Hayao Sonoda - Tomoko's Brother
 Katsumi Tezuka as Maguma

Release
Gorath was released theatrically in Japan on 21 March 1962, where it was distributed by Toho. It was released in the United States as Gorath by Brenco Pictures through Allied Artists Pictures with an English-language dub on 15 May 1964. The film was double-billed in the United States with The Human Vapor.

Reception
In a contemporary review, ""Whit." of Variety declared it as "generally a first-class endeavour" noting that "particular credit goes to Eiji Tsuburaya  for his special effects" and the acting by Ryō Ikebe was a highlight of the cast. Another review from "Whit." from the same issue of Variety found its double feature The Human Vapor the more interesting film plotwise.

See also 
 Passage to Pluto, a 1973 novel by Hugh Walters which also involves an ultra-dense wandering planet
 Melancholia (2011 film)
The Wandering Earth, a 2019 film which also involves a man-made change of Earth's course.
 Nibiru cataclysm

Notes

References

Footnotes

Sources

External links

 

1962 films
1960s science fiction films
Japanese epic films
Films directed by Ishirō Honda

Films set in 1979
Films set in 1980

Films set in 1982
Films set in Antarctica
Films set in Tokyo
Films set in the future
Giant monster films
1960s Japanese-language films
Kaiju films
1960s monster movies
Space adventure films
Toho tokusatsu films
Films produced by Tomoyuki Tanaka
1960s Japanese films